Kwan Po is one of the 27 constituencies in the Sai Kung District.

The constituency returns one district councillor to the Sai Kung District Council, with an election every four years.

Kwan Po constituency is loosely based on La Cite Noble and Tseung Kwan O Plaza in Tseung Kwan O with estimated population of 13,726.

Councillors represented

Election results

2010s

Notes

References

Tseung Kwan O
Constituencies of Hong Kong
Constituencies of Sai Kung District Council
2015 establishments in Hong Kong
Constituencies established in 2015